Saiyed Sagir Ahmed (1 July 1935 – 31 January 2011) was a judge at Supreme court of India and served as Chief Justice of Jammu and Kashmir and Andhra Pradesh High courts.

References

1935 births
2011 deaths
Chief Justices of the Jammu and Kashmir High Court
Chief Justices of the Andhra Pradesh High Court
20th-century Indian judges
Justices of the Supreme Court of India